Kapok may refer to:

Kapok tree, several species
Kapok fibre, made from Ceiba pentandra, one of the kapok tree species
Kampong Kapok, a Bruneian village
Kapok (Guitar Brand)